The Mitchell River is a river located in Far North Queensland, Australia.

The Mitchell River has the state's largest discharge, at  annually, but is intermittent and may be dry for part of the year. Lake Mitchell is the main water storage facility on the river.

It was named by Ludwig Leichhardt on the 16 June 1845 after Sir Thomas Mitchell while he was on his overland expedition from Moreton Bay to Port Essington.  It may have been previously named the Vereenighde River in 1623 by a Dutch merchant and navigator, Jan Carstensz.

Biophysical aspects

The Mitchell River and its tributaries have for a long time carved their way westwards through the rugged, weathered highlands of the Great Dividing Range, carrying away sediments to be deposited in the broad floodplains and wetlands of the Gulf Savannah country.

The rivers' waters  'pulse' annually with monsoonal rains, seasonally collecting water from across the local tropical rainforests in the highlands to the east; the wet sclerophyll forests in the central uplands; a variety of woodlands plus savannah in the western plains; annually flooding with freshwater, the tidal plains, wetlands, estuaries, and mangroves of the lower Mitchell and coastal plains.

From source to mouth, the Mitchell River is joined by 34 tributaries including the McLeod River, Hodgkinson River, St George River, Dry River, Little Mitchell River, Walsh River, Lynd River, Palmer River and Alice River.

Protected areas within the Mitchell River catchment include the Hann Tableland, Mitchell-Alice Rivers, Chillagoe-Mungana Caves, part of Bulleringa to the south, and most of the Forty Mile Scrub national parks.

Fauna and Flora

Being a large river system, the Mitchell River may contain within its catchment one of Australia's most ecologically diverse aquatic systems consisting of a rich variety of both wet and dry tropical monsoonal habitats.

The catchment ecology as a whole has been generally described as follows:

The vegetation in the Mitchell River Catchment area ranges from the World Heritage Wet Tropic rainforest on the eastern highlands to the open savannah on the western and lower Mitchell plains. The extensive mangroves and lagoon systems at the delta of the Mitchell River are recognised worldwide. The permanent waters in the upper catchment are associated with springs and water holes..

More specifically, while this ecologically diverse river system is relatively poorly studied, it is known to contain at least 18 rare, endangered or vulnerable animal species including the golden-shouldered parrot, the Gouldian finch and the northern bettong.  The mouth of the river lies in the Gulf Plains Important Bird Area.

Towns
The major towns in the river's catchment are Kowanyama, Chillagoe, Dimbulah, Mount Carbine, Mount Molloy.  Other smaller towns in the Mitchell River catchment include Mutchilba and Almaden.

History 
Kunjen (also known as Koko Wanggara, Ngundjan and Olkola) is a language of Western Cape York. The Kunjen language region includes the landscape within the local government boundaries of Kowanyama Community Council and Cook Shire Council.

Yir Yiront (also known as Yiront, Jirjoront, Yir-yiront, and Kokomindjan) is an Australian Aboriginal language. Its traditional language region is in Western Cape York within the local government areas of Aboriginal Shire of Kowanyama and Shire of Cook, in the catchments of the Coleman River and Mitchell River. Following the removal of Aboriginal people from their traditional lands, it is also spoken in Pormpuraaw and Kowanyama.

See also

List of rivers of the Queensland

References

External links

Maps
Mitchell River Watershed Management Group's Map of the Mitchell River's catchment area
Mitchell River Watershed Management Group's Map of Towns, Communities, Stations and Riverways in the Catchment
Mitchell River Watershed Management Group's Map of the Biophysical Regions through which the Mitchell River passes
Queensland Department of Natural Resources and Water Map of Mitchell River Catchment waterways (including Water Resource Plan boundaries)

Organisations
 Official homepage of Mitchell River Watershed Management Group Inc

Videos
 Our World 2 Video & Brief on local Aboriginal Knowledge of SeaLevel Rise in Mitchell River catchment, including footage and the telling of some traditional knowledge for Mitchell River Accessed 28 January 2009

Rivers of Far North Queensland
Gulf of Carpentaria